The 27th Special Operations Group (27 SOG) is the flying component of the 27th Special Operations Wing, assigned to the Air Force Special Operations Command (AFSOC). The group is stationed at Cannon Air Force Base, New Mexico.

The Group carries out global special operations tasks as an Air Force component of the United States Special Operations Command. It conducts infiltration/exfiltration, combat support, helicopter and tilt-rotor aerial refueling, psychological warfare, and other special missions. It directs the deployment, employment, training, and planning for squadrons that operate the AC-130W, MC-130J, CV-22B, U-28A and MQ-9, and provides operational support to flying operations.

During the Second World War, its predecessor unit, the 27th Bombardment (later Fighter) Group fought in the Pacific Ocean and Mediterranean, Middle East and African theatres. Its ground personnel fought as infantry in the 1941–1942 Battle of Bataan with the survivors being forced to march as prisoners in the Bataan Death March. Later, its air echelon was awarded five Distinguished Unit Citations and a Philippine Presidential Unit Citation. The airmen of the 27th were among the most decorated USAAF units of the war.

History 
On 1 February 1940, the United States Army Air Corps activated the 27th Bombardment Group (Light) at Barksdale Army Airfield, Louisiana and equipped it with the Douglas B-18 Bolo Light bomber aircraft. The group consisted of the 15th, 16th and 17th Bombardment Squadrons. In October 1941 the group moved to Hunter Army Airfield, Georgia, less the 15th Bombardment Squadron, which was reassigned to V Air Support Command on 14 October. On 21 October 1941 the group was ordered to the Philippine Islands in response to the growing crisis in the Pacific.

World War II

Philippine Campaign 1941–1942 

Arriving at Fort William McKinley in the Philippines on 20 November, the 27th BG (L) readied itself for delivery of its A-24 Dauntless aircraft. Concern grew as days turned into weeks and still the planes had not arrived. When the Imperial Japanese Army attacked the Philippines on 9 December 1941, the situation had not changed. Unknown to the 27th BG (L) Airmen, to avoid capture or destruction, the ship carrying the planes was diverted to Australia when the war escalated.

On 18 December Major John H. Davies, 27th BG (L) commander, and an aircrew of 20 flew from Clark Field on Luzon in two B-18s and one Douglas C-39 of Transport Command to Tarakan Island in the Dutch East Indies to Darwin Australia arriving on 22 December. Flying from Darwin, the group arrived in Brisbane on 24 December to pick up their A-24s off the ship USAT Meigs. However, as a swift Japanese advance prevented his group from returning to the Philippines, the air echelon of the 27th was ordered to operate from Brisbane.

The ground echelon of the 27th still in the Philippines was evacuated south from Luzon on 25 December to the Bataan Peninsula, arriving to form the 2nd Battalion (27th Bombardment Group) Provisional Infantry Regiment (Air Corp). For the 99 days following the attack on Pearl Harbor until their surrender to the Japanese after the Battle of Bataan, the men of the 27th BG became the only Air Force unit in history to fight as an infantry regiment, and were the only unit to be taken captive in whole. After surrendering, they were forced to endure the infamous Bataan Death March. Of the 880 or so Airmen who were taken, less than half survived captivity.

However, a number of officers and enlisted men of the 27th Bomb Group were evacuated out of the Philippines in five U.S. Navy submarines just before it was overrun by the Japanese during April.

Dutch East Indies and New Guinea Campaigns 1942 

In Australia, the escaped airmen and aircraft of the 27th Bomb Group reformed into a combat unit. In early 12 February pilots of the 91st Sqdn flew their A-24's with gunners from Brisbane to Malang Java in the colonial Dutch East Indies to defend the island. The group participated in an attack on the Japanese invasion fleet landing troops on Bali. The attacks, carried out during the afternoon of 19 February and throughout the morning of 20 February, caused little damage and all air operations that day failed to halt the landings. The group was credited with the sinking of a Japanese cruiser and a destroyer. From 27 February through 1 March, three A-24's of the 91st Sqdn participated in Battle of the Java Sea. The remaining pilots and gunners of the 27th Bomb Group were flown out to Australia in early March, consolidating with the 16th and 17th Squadrons which had moved from Brisbane to Batchelor Airfield in the Northern Territory. For their heroic efforts in the Philippines and the Southwest Pacific during late 1941 and early 1942, the 27th Bombardment Group (Light) received three Distinguished Unit Citations (DUC).

On 25 March, Davies and the surviving 27th Bomb Group personnel, consisting of 42 officers, 62 enlisted men and 24 A-24s, were reassigned on mass to the four squadrons of the 3d Bombardment Group at Charters Towers Airfield in Queensland, Australia. The remaining A-24 aircraft were added to the 8th Bombardment Squadron. On 4 May, the 27th Bomb Group was officially inactivated.

(Davies was appointed CO of the 3rd BG, and senior pilots from the 27th BG became commanders of the 8th, 13th and 90th Squadrons respectively.  Over the next 21 months they flew combat missions over the Philippines, New Guinea and Rabaul. Among many other operations, the 3rd BG played a leading role at the Battle of the Bismarck Sea.)

European-African-Middle Eastern Theater

North African Campaign 
At Hunter, the group was re-manned and re-equipped with the Douglas A-20 Havoc light bomber. After additional training in Mississippi and Louisiana, on 26 December the group was transferred to Ste-Barbe-du-Tlelat Airfield, Algeria to enter combat in North Africa with Twelfth Air Force.

Maintenance and support personnel went by sea to North Africa while aircrews and the A-20s flew to South America then across to North Africa, In North Africa, the A-20s were sent to other groups and the 27th Bomb Group was redesignated as the 27th Fighter-Bomber Group and reequipped with the North American A-36 Invader dive bomber. The 27th FBG flew its first combat missions of the war from Korba, Tunisia, on 6 June 1943.

The 27th served in the Mediterranean Theater of Operations until the end of the war. It was redesignated the 27th Fighter Group in May 1944 when the group converted first to the Curtiss P-40 Warhawk, then to the Republic P-47 Thunderbolt aircraft.

Sicilian/Italian Campaigns 
During the Sicilian Campaign, operations included participation in the reduction of Pantelleria and Lampedusa Islands and supporting ground forces during the conquest of Sicily. In the Italian Campaign the 27th covered the landings at Salerno and received a Distinguished Unit Citation (DUC) for preventing three German armored divisions from reaching the Salerno beachhead on 10 September 1943. In addition, the group supported the Fifth Army during the Allied drive toward Rome.

Southern France 
The group took part in the invasion of Southern France and assisted Seventh Army's advance up the Rhône Valley, receiving a second DUC for helping to disrupt the German retreat, 4 September 1944.

The 27th took part in the interdiction of the enemy's communications in northern Italy, and assisted in the Allied drive from France into Germany during the last months of the war, eventually being stationed at Biblis, Germany on V-E Day.

With five Distinguished Unit Citations and a Philippine Presidential Unit Citation, the Airmen of the 27th were among the most decorated USAAF units of World War II.

Cold War

Postwar era 

In the immediate postwar drawdown of the USAAF, the 27th Fighter Group was returned to the United States in October 1945, then inactivated on 7 November at Camp Shanks, New York. Within a year, the group was reactivated in Germany on 20 August 1946, being assigned to Fritzlar Air Base, flying P-47 Thunderbolts.

The group stayed in Germany for a year performing occupation duty until being transferred, without personnel or equipment, to Andrews AAF, Maryland, in June 1947. The 27th was assigned to Strategic Air Command and reactivated at Kearney AAF Nebraska. Fighter Squadrons of the 27th were the 522d, 523d and 524th.

The 27th was initially equipped with the North American P-51D Mustang, and in 1948 was upgraded to the new North American F-82E Twin Mustang. In June 1948 the designation "P" for pursuit was changed to "F" for fighter. Subsequently, all P-51s were redesignated F-51s. The mission of the 27th Fighter Wing was to fly long-range escort missions for SAC Boeing B-29 Superfortress bombers. With the arrival of the F-82s, the older F-51s were sent to Air National Guard units.

The first production F-82Es reached the 27th in early 1948, and almost immediately the group was deployed to McChord AFB, Washington, in June where its squadrons stood on alert on a secondary air defense mission due to heightened tensions over the Berlin Airlift. It was also believed that the 27th would launch an escort mission, presumably to the Soviet Union, if conflict broke out in Europe. From McChord, the group flew its Twin Mustangs on weather reconnaissance missions over the northwest Pacific, but problems were encountered with their fuel tanks. Decommissioned F-61 Black Widow external tanks were found at Hamilton AFB, California that could be modified for the F-82 which were fitted on the pylons of the Twin Mustang that solved the problem. With a reduction in tensions, the 27th returned to its home base in Nebraska during September where the unit settled down to transition flying with their aircraft.

On 1 August 1948 the 27th Fighter Wing was activated. Although established over a year earlier in July 1947. Under the Hobson Plan the 27th FW commanded the functions of both the support groups as well as the flying combat 27th Fighter Group and the squadrons assigned to it.

Four F-82s were deployed to Alaska from McChord where the pilots provided transition training to the 449th Fighter (All Weather) Squadron which used Twin Mustangs in the air defense mission. They remained in Alaska for about 45 days, returning to rejoin the rest of the group at the beginning of November 1948.

In January 1949, Eighth Air Force planned a large celebration at Carswell AFB. All of its assigned units were to participate in a coordinated flyover. Most of SAC's bombers were to participate, along with SAC's only "Long Range" fighter group, the 27th. The weather in Nebraska in January that year was especially horrible, with most airports in the Midwest weathered in the day of the display. At Kearney AFB, the base was socked-in with a blizzard. Nevertheless, the crews had an early morning mission briefing, the aircraft in the hangars were preflighted and prepared for the flyover mission. Paths were cut through the snow for the aircraft to taxi and somehow the F-82s got airborne, with the 27th's Twin Mustangs joining up with SAC bombers over Oklahoma on schedule. The flyover by the Twin Mustangs was a tremendous success, with SAC leadership being amazed that the F-82 was truly an "all weather" aircraft and the 27th being able to carry out their mission despite the weather.

In early 1949, the 27th began carrying out long-range escort profile missions. Flights to Puerto Rico, Mexico, the Bahamas and nonstop to Washington D.C were carried out. For President Truman's 1949 inauguration, the 27th FEW launched 48 aircraft to fly in review, along with several other fighter units, in formation down Pennsylvania Avenue. Another flyover over the newly -dedicated Idlewild Airport in New York City soon followed, with the aircraft flying non-stop from Kearney AFB.

With the tight defense budgets in the late 1940s, the decision was made by Strategic Air Command decided to close Kearney AFB in 1949. The 27th was transferred to Bergstrom AFB Texas on 16 March.

At Bergstrom, the 27th transitioned to jet aircraft with Republic Aviation F-84E Thunderjet in 1950. It was redesignated the 27th Fighter-Escort Group, to better represent the mission of the group on 1 February. By the end of summer, the transition to the Tunderjets was complete and the Twin Mustangs were mostly sent to reclamation, with a few being sent to Far East Air Forces or Alaska as replacement aircraft or for air defense duties.

The wing won the Mackay Trophy for successful deployment of 180 F-84s from Bergstrom AFB, to Fürstenfeldbruck Air Base West Germany, in September 1950, via Labrador, Greenland, Iceland, and England, delivering the Thunderjets to the 36th Fighter-Bomber Group. This was the Second (the first being the 20th FG flying 64 F-84Ds on 20 July 1950 during Operation "READY" from Shaw AB, SC to RAF Manston, UK) long-range mass flight of jet aircraft in aviation history.

After the pilots and support ground personnel were flown back to Bergstrom on MATS transports, a new production batch of F-84Es were picked up, and on 15 October the group headed for Neubiberg Air Base, West Germany, this time with ninety-two aircraft.

Korean War 

Upon their return to Bergstrom in November 1950, the 27th anticipated another delivery trip to Europe and a permanent change of station to United States Air Forces in Europe. However, this was changed to a deployment to Japan and duty in the Korean War.

The 27th departed Bergstrom on 11 November with the 522d FES refueling en route at Biggs AFB, Texas; the 523d FES at Kirtland AFB, New Mexico, and the 524th FES at Williams AFB, Arizona on the way to San Diego, California. The overseas transport of the 27th was via the USS Bairoko on 14 November and the USS Bataan on 16 November. The USS Cape Esperance, with the remainder of the wing was scheduled to depart from San Francisco on 27 November, but this was delayed for two days while fifty F-86A Sabres and their equipment for the 4th Fighter-Interceptor Wing were loaded for their transfer to Japan.

By 30 November the ground echelon had arrived at Kimpo Air Base (K-14), South Korea, preparing for the arrival of the air echelon which had been unloaded in Japan. Once unloaded from the transport carriers, the aircraft were barged to Kisarazu Air Base where they were preflighted for a short flight to Yokota Air Base. However the aircraft were damaged during their trans-Pacific open-air deck shipment and had salt air induced corrosion; corroded electrical equipment and landing gear damage. Some of the aircraft also had flat tires. On 1 December Far East Air Forces decided they would station their short-ranged 4th FIG at Kimpo (K-14) and the 27th was ordered split into forward and rear echelons. Advanced headquarters would be at Taegu Air Base (K-2), South Korea; while the rear echelon would locate at Itazuke Air Base, Japan. The advanced echelon would be attached to the F-80 Shooting Star equipped 49th Fighter-Bomber Wing at Tageu for logistical support, while the rear portion would be attached to the provisional 6160th Air Base Wing at Itazuke for the same kind of support.

The first six of rapidly repaired F-84Es arrived at K-2 on 5 December. All of these aircraft were equipped with special gun camera that were depressed to record bomb strikes. They were also JATO-Equipped with a special electronic system for their operation. The 27th flew their first combat mission on 6 December 1950; the mission being an "armed reconnaissance" over the Chinnampo River area. Over the next two days, thirty-two rockets and 7,200 rounds of .50 caliber ammunition were expended. Several locomotives were claimed as damaged and a North Korean village was strafed.

On 13 December two 27th FEG Thunderjets were lost on a strafing mission two miles west of Krin-ni when the aircraft did not return and crashed to the ground. One aircraft crashed on the ground; the cause not known; another was given a go-around at K-2 because of other traffic. The aircraft suddenly lost power and made a belly landing in a dry creek bed; the Thunderjet written-off as a result. By January, the remainder of the 27th's aircraft were made operational.

For the next six months, the 27th flew missions in support of ground forces, earning another DUC for missions between 26 January and 21 April 1951. Among these missions was close support of the largest paratroop landing in the Korean War and escort for Boeing B-29 Superfortress bombers on raids over North Korea, including air-to-air combat with enemy MiG-15 fighters.

They were also given the responsibility of assisting the 49th Fighter-Bomber Wing in transition from F-80Cs to F-84Es. In eight months of combat, the 27th had participated in three major campaigns and earned the Republic of Korea Presidential Unit Citation. They had flown 12,000 combat missions and had lost seven of their pilots in combat, and fifteen F-84 aircraft to all causes.

The 27th was relieved from assignment to FEAF in July 1951 and returned to Bergstrom AFB. Inactivated on 16 June 1952 when the group was considered redundant.

The 1990s 

The group was reactivated in on 1 November 1991 as the 27th Operations Group and assigned to the 27th Fighter Wing as part of the "Objective Wing" concept adapted by the Air Force. The 27th OG was bestowed the lineage, honors and history of its predecessor 27 Tactical Fighter Group. The 27th Operations Group took control of the wing's fighter squadrons upon activation.

From September 1992 to July 1993, the group's F-111 aircrews and support personnel rotated to Incirlik Air Base, Turkey, in support of Operation Provide Comfort in northern Iraq.

In 1995 the face of the flightline changed when the wing began its transition to General Dynamics F-16C/D fighter aircraft. The first F-16s to arrive in May were assigned to the 522d Fighter Squadron. Also transitioning were the 523d and 524th Fighter Squadrons. With the arrival of the F-16s, the F-111s were sent to the Aerospace Maintenance and Regeneration Center in Arizona. The 428th Fighter Squadron was inactivated in September 1995, and the ECW EF-111A-equipped 429 ECS was inactivated in May 1998 with the 27th Operations Group officially holding a retirement ceremony in memorial park. The F-111 in various forms had been at Cannon AFB for 29 years. With their retirement, the 430 ECS was inactivated.

On 15 January 1998, the 524th Fighter Squadron ventured to the desert for their first overseas deployment since transitioning to the F-16. The 522d Fighter Squadron deployed to Prince Sultan Air Base, Saudi Arabia in direct support of Operation SOUTHERN WATCH. They flew missions enforcing UN resolutions of no-fly zone over Southern Iraq. In March, the 523d Fighter Squadron also deployed to Southwest Asia in support of Operation Southern Watch.

These two 27 FW squadrons were the first F-16 unit to replace Republic A-10 Thunderbolt II units performing close air support. In addition, they were the first F-16 unit to maintain the demanding combat search and rescue alert in Southwest Asia. While deployed to the Gulf region in December 1998, the F-16s from the 522d Fighter Squadron provided close air support alert, defensive counter air alert and interdiction in Iraq.

In August 1998, the 524th Fighter Squadron deployed to Hill AFB, Utah for exercise Combat Hammer. During the exercise, they dropped inert GBU-24 Paveway III laser-guided bombs and fired live AGM-65 Maverick antitank missiles on Utah test range. The hit rate was one of the highest ever seen in the Air Force, showcasing the lethality of the Block 40 F-16.

In 1998, the governments of the United States and Singapore signed an agreement laying the foundation of the Peace Carvin III program. As a Foreign Military Sales training program for the Republic of Singapore Air Force (RSAF), Peace Carvin III was designed for the continued training of RSAF in rapid deployment and tactical employment of the block 52 F-16C/D throughout a wide spectrum of missions including air-to-air, joint maritime and precision air-to-ground weapons delivery.

In support of Peace Carvin III, the 428th Fighter Squadron was reactivated on 12 November 1998 and tasked to take the lead in Peace Carvin III. The squadron was a hybrid of USAF and RSAF F-16C/D manned by USAF instructor pilots, Singaporean pilots and combined RSAF and USAF teams of maintenance and support personnel.

In May 1999, the 428th Fighter Squadron participated in its first official major exercise after its reactivation. The squadron deployed to Tyndall Air Force Base, Florida, for exercise Combat Archer. The exercise was designed to test weapons capabilities, tactics and employment. This included the first live firing of radar-guided air-to-air AIM-7 Sparrow by the RSAF.

With the completion of Peace Carvin III, the 428 FS was inactivated on 6 July 2005.

In July 1999, the 522d Fighter Squadron deployed to Naval Air Station Keflavik, Iceland, to support NATO exercise Coronet Norsemen. They served primarily as the combat air arm of the Iceland Defense Force. In August 1999, the 523d Fighter Squadron relieved the 522d Fighter Squadron from Coronet Norsemen.

During Operation Allied Force in the former Yugoslavia in 1999, the 524th Fighter Squadron was notified for "on-call" duty to augment forces. Quick termination of hostilities precluded the 524th Fighter Squadron from seeing action.

Twenty-first century 
On 11 September 2001 when terrorists attacked the World Trade Center in New York City and The Pentagon in Washington, D.C., aircraft from the 27 FW went on air defense alert.

Two weeks following the 9/11 attacks members of the 27th Civil Engineer Squadron Prime BEEF team had deployed to a forward location in the AOR and built a tent city at a (then) Classified location. They would not return till March 2002.

In December 2002, the 524 FS deployed to Kuwait and participated in Operation IRAQI FREEDOM, dropping nearly a million pounds of precision guided munitions, more than any other F-16 Block 40 squadron in history.

In September 2007, the 522d Expeditionary Fighter Squadron wrapped up the final deployment for their squadron and, ultimately, the 27th Operations Group.

The 522d Fighter Squadron, known as the Fireballs, were inactivated upon their return to Cannon AFB and the 27 FW became the 27th Special Operations Group on 1 October 2007. Among the units that joined the group were the 3d SOS (MQ-1), 73d SOS (MC-130W) and 318th SOS (light transport aircraft) as well as the 20th SOS (CV-22s).

Today there are twelve squadrons within the group:
 27th Special Operations Support Squadron (27 SOSS) – provides operational support to flight operations
 3d Special Operations Squadron (3 SOS) – MQ-9 Reaper
 6th Special Operations Squadron - MC-130J
 9th Special Operations Squadron (9 SOS) – MC-130J Commando II
 12th Special Operations Squadron, provides remotely piloted aircraft launch and recovery operations
 16th Special Operations Squadron (16 SOS) – AC-130J
 17th Special Operations Squadron - AC-130J
 20th Special Operations Squadron (20 SOS) – CV-22 Osprey
 33d Special Operations Squadron (33 SOS) – MQ-9 Reaper
 56th Special Operations Intelligence Squadron
 310th Special Operations Squadron - U-28A
 318th Special Operations Squadron (318 SOS) – U-28A

Lineage 
 Established as 27th Bombardment Group (Light) on 22 December 1939
 Activated on 1 February 1940
 Redesignated: 27th Fighter Bomber Group on 23 August 1943
 Redesignated: 27th Fighter Group on 30 May 1944
 Inactivated on 7 November 1945
 Activated on 20 August 1946 by redesignation of 366th Fighter Group
 Redesignated 27th Fighter-Escort Group on 1 February 1950
 Inactivated on 16 June 1952
 Redesignated: 27th Tactical Fighter Group on 31 July 1985 (Remained inactive)
 Redesignated: 27th Operations Group on 28 October 1991
 Activated on 1 November 1991
 Redesignated 27th Special Operations Group on 1 October 2007

The 27th Special Operations Group, located at Cannon Air Force Base, New Mexico, conducts infiltration/exfiltration, combat support, tilt-rotor operations, helicopter aerial refueling, close air support, unmanned aerial vehicle operations, non-standard aviation, and other special missions. It directs the deployment, employment, training, and planning for squadrons that operate the AC-130W, MC-130J, CV-22B, C-146A, U-28A, MQ-1, MQ-9 and provides operational support to flying operations.

Throughout the last 68 years, the 27th designation has been assigned to several groups and wings at a myriad of locations. The 27th was organized as a fighter wing in August 1947, at Kearney Airfield, Nebraska. Later, in February 1958, in a move to preserve the heritage of the 27th, Air Force leadership transferred the designation to Cannon, replacing the 312th Wing.
Since 1958, the wing had supported F-100s, T/AT-33s, F-111s and F-16s.

Assignments

 Southeast Air District (later, 3 Air Force), 1 February 1940
 3d Air Support Command, 1 September 1941
 V Bomber Command, c. 20 November 1941
 Ground echelon attached to: V Interceptor Command, 24 December 1941 – 8 May 1942
 Air echelon under operational control of American-British-Dutch-Australian Command, c. March-4 May 1942
 3d Air Force, 4 May 1942
 3d Bomber Command, 7 July 1942
 III Ground Air (later, III Air) Support Command, 10 August 1942
 Twelfth Air Force, c. 25 December 1942
 XII Air Support (later, XII Tactical Air) Command, July 1943

 XII Fighter (later, XXII Tactical Air) Command, 20 September 1944
 Attached to XII Tactical Command, 20 September-2 October 1944
 63d Fighter Wing
 Attached to First Tactical Air Force [Provisional], 21 February 1945
 XII Tactical Air Command, 30 March 1945
 64th Fighter Wing, 7 July–October 1945; 20 August 1946
 Strategic Air Command, 25 June 1947
 Eighth Air Force, 16 July 1947
 27th Fighter (later, 27th Fighter-Escort) Wing, 15 August 1947 – 16 June 1952
 27th Fighter Wing, 1 November 1991
 27th Special Operations Wing, 1 October 2007–present

Components
 11th Reconnaissance (later, 91st Bombardment; 524th Fighter-Bomber; 524th Fighter; 524th Fighter-Escort; 524th Fighter, 524th Special Operations) Squadron: attached, 15 January 1941; assigned 14 January 1941 – 7 November 1945; 20 August 1946 – 16 June 1952 (detached, 25 August 1951 – 16 June 1952); 1 November 1991 – 30 September 2007
 15th Bombardment Squadron: 1 February 1940 – 14 October 1941
 16th Bombardment (later, 522d Fighter-Bomber, 522d Fighter; 522d Fighter-Escort; 522d Fighter) Squadron: 1 February 1940 – 7 November 1945; 20 August 1946 – 16 June 1952 (detached, 6 August 1951 – 16 June 1952); 1 November 1991 – 30 September 2007
 17th Bombardment (later, 523d Fighter-Bomber; 523d Fighter; 523d Fighter-Escort; 523d Fighter) Squadron: 1 February 1940 – 7 November 1945; 20 August 1946 – 16 June 1952 (detached, 6 August 1951 – 16 June 1952); 1 November 1991 – 30 September 2007
 428th Fighter Squadron: 1 November 1991 – 12 October 1995; 15 September 1998 – 30 September 2007
 429th Electronic Combat: 22 June 1993 – 19 June 1998
 430th Electronic Combat: 1 August 1992 – 29 June 1993
 465th Bombardment Squadron: 13 July-21 November 1942.

Stations

 Barksdale Field, Louisiana, 1 February 1940
 Hunter Field, Georgia, 7 October 1940 – 21 October 1941
 Philippines Commonwealth, 20 November 1941
 Ground echelon at: Fort William McKinley, Luzon, Philippines Commonwealth,
 Assigned as ground forces as 27th Bombardment Group Provisional Infantry Regiment (Air Corp), Bataan, on 24 December 1941 – 8 May 1942
 Air echelon diverted to: Archerfield Airport, Australia, 24 December 1941– March 1942
 Batchelor Airfield, Australia, March-4 May 1942
 Hunter Field, Georgia, 4 May 1942
 Key Field, Mississippi, c. 14 July 1942
 Hattiesburg Army Airfield, Mississippi, 15 August 1942
 Harding Army Airfield, Louisiana, 25 October-21 November 1942
 Ste-Barbe-du-Tlelat Airfield, Algeria, 26 December 1942
 Nouvion Airfield, Algeria, January 1943
 Ras el Ma Airfield, French Morocco, c. 4 April 1943
 Korba Airfield, Tunisia, June 1943
 Ponte Olivo Airfield, Sicily, July 1943
 Capaccio Airfield, Italy, September 1943
 Guado Airfield, Italy, 4 November 1943
 Pomigliano Airfield, Italy, 19 January 1944
 Castel Volturno Airfield, Italy, 10 April 1944
 Santa Maria Airfield, Italy, 8 May 1944

 La Banca Airfield, Italy, 7 June 1944
 Rome Ciampino Airport, Italy, 12 June 1944
 Serragia Airfield, Corsica, July 1944
 Le Luc Airfield, France, August 1944
 Salon de Provence Airfield (ALG Y-16), France, 30 April 1944
 Loyettes Airfield (ALG Y-25), France, c. 11 September 1944
 Tarquinia Airfield, Italy, October 1944
 Pontedera Airfield, Italy, 3 December 1944
 St Dizier Airfield (ALG A-64), France, c. 22 February 1945
 Toul-Ochey Airfield (ALG A-96), France, c. 19 March 1945
 Biblis Airfield (Y-78), Germany, April 1945
 AAF Station Mannheim/Sandhofen, Germany, 24 June 1945
 AAF Station Echterdingen, Germany, 15 September-20 October 1945
 Camp Shanks, New York, 6–7 November 1945
 AAF Station Fritzlar, Germany, 20 August 1946 – 25 June 1947
 Andrews Field, Maryland, 25 June 1947
 Kearney AAFld (later, AFB), Nebraska, 16 July 1947
 Bergstrom AFB, Texas, 16 March 1949 – 11 November 1950
 Taegu AB (K-2), South Korea, 5 December 1950
 Itazuke AB, Japan, 31 January – 2 July 1951
 Bergstrom AFB, Texas, 6 July 1951 – 16 June 1952
 Cannon AFB, New Mexico, 1 November 1991–present

Aircraft assigned

 A-24 Dauntless, 1941
 A-20 Havoc, 1941, 1942–1943
 A-36 Apache, 1943–1944
 P-40 Warhawk, 1944
 P-47 Thunderbolt, 1944–1947
 P/F-51 Mustang, 1947–1949

 F-82 Twin Mustang, 1948–1950
 F-84 Thunderstreak, 1950–1951
 F-100 Super Sabre, 1958-1970
 General Dynamics F-111 Aardvark, 1969–1996
 EF-111 Raven, 1992–1998
 F-16 Falcon, 1995–2007

References

Bibliography
 Bartsch, William H. 8 December 1941: MacArthur's Pearl Harbor (Texas A&M University Military History Series 87., 2003)
 Edmonds, Walter D. They Fought With What They Had: The Story of the Army Air Forces in the Southwest Pacific, 1941–1942 (1951, 1982)
 Martin, Adrian R. and Larry W. Stephenson, Operation Plum: The Ill-Fated 27th Bombardment Group and the Fight for the Western Pacific (Texas A & M University Military History – 2008)
 
 May, Mary Cathrin, The Steadfast Line: The Story of the 27th Bombardment Group (Light) in World War II (Privately Published 2003, 2006)

External links
 Air Force Historical Research Agency, 27th Operations Group 
 ArmyAirForces.Com 27th Fighter Group
 The 27th Bombardment Group (L) in Australia during the Second World War
 History of the 27th Bomb Group

027
Military units and formations in New Mexico